William Earl Buchan (born May 9, 1935) is an American sailor and Olympic Champion. He competed at the 1984 Summer Olympics in Los Angeles and won a gold medal in the Star class with Steven Erickson.

He sailed on Intrepid in the 1974 America's Cup defender trials.

Biography
Buchan was born on May 9, 1935 in Seattle, Washington. He was the son of Bill Buchan Sr.

He won ten medals at Star World Championships (from 1961 to 1985), including three golds. His son William Carl Buchan won a gold medal in the Flying Dutchman class at the 1984 Olympics.  Buchan was inducted into the National Sailing Hall of Fame in 2013.

See also
 Star World Championships - Multiple medallist

References

External links
 
 
 

1935 births
Living people
American male sailors (sport)
Olympic gold medalists for the United States in sailing
Sailors at the 1984 Summer Olympics – Star
Star class world champions
Medalists at the 1984 Summer Olympics
1974 America's Cup sailors
World champions in sailing for the United States
Soling class world champions